Clapham (postcode 5062), located approximately  south of the Adelaide city centre, is a primarily residential suburb situated within the City of Mitcham, incorporating some of the foothills. The suburb is named after Clapham in London, England. Neighbouring suburbs are Colonel Light Gardens, Panorama, Lynton, Torrens Park and Lower Mitcham.

Transport
Public transport to this suburb includes the Belair railway line (Torrens Park and Lynton stations) and Adelaide Metro bus route 200, which travels along East Parkway. Until 1995 it was also served by the Clapham railway station.

Government
Clapham is in the City of Mitcham local government area, the South Australian House of Assembly electoral district of Elder and the Australian House of Representatives Division of Boothby.

Schools
The state government school, Clapham Primary School, is located in Clapham and is an R-7 school. Out of schools hours child care is provided through the school.

References

Hills Face Zone

See also
 List of Adelaide suburbs

Suburbs of Adelaide